Guillermo Antonio Quiroz (born November 29, 1981) is a Venezuelan former professional baseball catcher. He has played in Major League Baseball (MLB) for the Toronto Blue Jays, Seattle Mariners, Texas Rangers, Baltimore Orioles, Boston Red Sox and San Francisco Giants.

Amateur career
Quiróz was born in Maracaibo, Venezuela on November 29, 1981. He played Little League Baseball for Cocquivacoa, and was teammates with Yusmeiro Petit. In 1994, Cocquivacoa won Venezuela's first Little League World Series title. Then aged 10, Quiróz started every game that season as a catcher. Two year later, Quiróz won the Senior League World Series.

Professional career

Toronto Blue Jays

Quiróz was signed by the Toronto Blue Jays as a non-drafted free agent in 1998, before his 17th birthday, with a $1 million signing bonus. He progressed through Toronto's system as the team's number-one catching prospect. In addition, Baseball America rated him as the Blue Jays' third best prospect in their 2004 pre-season rankings, and the 35th best prospect in all of baseball.

Defensively, Quiróz has good skills. In 2003, he threw out 45% of base stealers, and was the starting catcher for the World Team in the 2003 All-Star Futures Game.

He missed the end of the 2003 season with a collapsed lung. The broken hand and torn arm muscle he suffered in 2004 hurt his chances of taking over as the Blue Jays' starting catcher in 2005. Gregg Zaun and Greg Myers were re-signed to give Quiróz more time in the minors. However, Quiróz was set further back that season, due to shoulder strain and another collapsed lung.

In 2006, the Blue Jays signed catcher Jason Phillips initially as the backup to Gregg Zaun. They later signed Bengie Molina to be their new starter. This placed three catchers ahead of Quiróz on the Blue Jays' depth chart.

Seattle Mariners
On March 31, 2006, Quiróz was put on waivers by the Blue Jays, but was picked up by the Seattle Mariners on the same day. Quiróz started the seventh game of the 2006 season for the Mariners, but was outrighted to Triple-A Tacoma Rainers eight days later. Quiróz spent the rest of the season between Triple-A Tacoma and the Double-A San Antonio Missions.

Texas Rangers
Quiróz was signed by the Texas Rangers on December 28, 2006. He spent most of the 2007 season with the Triple-A Oklahoma RedHawks until a September call-up to the majors. At the end of the 2007 season, the Rangers outrighted Quiróz to the minors, but he refused the assignment and became a free agent.

Baltimore Orioles
On December 3, 2007, Quiróz signed a one-year major league contract with the Baltimore Orioles. He spent the 2008 season as the backup to catcher Ramón Hernández. He was invited to spring training and expected to compete for the backup catcher position at the start of the 2009 season, but was released on March 21.

Second stint with Mariners
In April 2009, Quiróz signed a minor league deal with the Seattle Mariners. On May 14, 2009, he was assigned to the Double-A West Tenn Diamond Jaxx from the Triple-A Tacoma Rainiers. On May 26, 2009, he was called up from West Tenn to the Seattle Mariners. On June 19, 2009, Quiróz was designated for assignment. He was later re-signed to a minor league deal in February 2010. Quiróz refused an assignment to the Rainiers at the end of the season and became a free agent on November 3, 2010.

San Diego Padres
On January 5, 2011, Quiróz signed a minor league deal with the San Diego Padres. He was invited to spring training to be the backup to Nick Hundley, but did not win the job and spent the season playing for the Tucson Padres.

Third Stint with Mariners

Quiróz signed a minor league contract with the Seattle Mariners on December 13, 2011. He received an invitation to spring training, but did not play for the Mariners in 2012. Instead he played for their Triple-A affiliate Tacoma Rainiers.

Boston Red Sox

On September 4, 2012, the Mariners traded Quiróz to the Boston Red Sox for cash considerations. Quiróz was designated for assignment on October 4. According to the International League transactions page, Quiróz was outrighted to the Pawtucket Red Sox on October 10, but chose to become a free agent.

San Francisco Giants
He signed a minor league deal with an invite to spring training with the San Francisco Giants in November 2012. On May 4, 2013 Quiróz hit his first career walk-off home run, a tenth inning, pinch-hit homer against former battery mate Brandon League of the Los Angeles Dodgers, leading the Giants to a 10–9 victory.

On November 15, 2013, Quiróz signed a minor league contract to return to the Giants. In November 2014, Quiróz was outrighted to Triple A. He refused the assignment and became a free agent on November 3, and then was re-signed to another minor league contract with the Giants.

Cleveland Indians
On February 12, 2016, Quiróz signed a minor league contract with the Cleveland Indians with an invitation to spring training. He signed another minor league contract with the Indians organization in November 2016. He was released on March 31, 2017.

Coaching career
Quiróz was named a coach for the Triple-A Charlotte Knights for the 2019 season. In January 2020, he was named manager of the Kannapolis Cannon Ballers, the Single-A affiliate of the Chicago White Sox.

See also

 List of Major League Baseball players from Venezuela

References

External links

1981 births
Living people
Águilas del Zulia players
Baltimore Orioles players
Boston Red Sox players
Cardenales de Lara players
Charleston AlleyCats players
Dunedin Blue Jays players
Fresno Grizzlies players
Hagerstown Suns players
Major League Baseball catchers
Major League Baseball players from Venezuela
Medicine Hat Blue Jays players
New Haven Ravens players
Oklahoma RedHawks players
Peoria Saguaros players
Queens Kings players
Sacramento River Cats players
San Antonio Missions players
San Francisco Giants players
Seattle Mariners players
Sportspeople from Maracaibo
Syracuse SkyChiefs players
Tacoma Rainiers players
Texas Rangers players
Tigres de Aragua players
Toronto Blue Jays players
Tucson Padres players
Venezuelan expatriate baseball players in Canada
Venezuelan expatriate baseball players in the United States
West Tennessee Diamond Jaxx players